Mark Reynolds  may refer to:

 Mark Reynolds (baseball) (born 1983), Major League Baseball player
 Mark Reynolds (basketball) (born 1984), Irish basketball player
 Mark Reynolds (footballer, born 1966), English footballer
 Mark Reynolds (footballer, born 1987), Scottish footballer
 Mark Reynolds (musician), one half of synthpop duo Red Flag
 Mark Reynolds (sailor) (born 1955), American Olympic sailor